General Ellis may refer to:

Arthur Ellis (British Army officer) (1837–1907), British Army major general
Fred E. Ellis (fl. 1960s–1990s), Texas Air National Guard major general
Larry R. Ellis (born 1946), U.S. Army general
Richard H. Ellis (1919–1989), U.S. Air Force general
Samuel Burdon Ellis (1782–1865), Royal Marines general

See also
Charles Ellice (1823–1888), British Army general
Robert Ellice (1784–1856), British Army general
General Elles (disambiguation)
Attorney General Ellis (disambiguation)